is an Italian-registered, Spanish-based UCI ProTeam cycling team, that was founded in 2018. The team was promoted from the UCI Continental level in 2021.

Based in Pinto, Spain, and sponsored by the Fundación Contador headed by Alberto Contador, it was launched in 2018 as a UCI Continental youth formation supporting the Trek-Segafredo team.  In 2021, under the patronage of the new sponsor , it acquired the UCI ProTeam license, and this season it was invited for the first time to the Giro d'Italia.

Team roster

Major wins
2018
 Stages 1 & 4 Tour of Antalya, Matteo Moschetti
 International Rhodes Grand Prix, Matteo Moschetti
 Stage 2 International Tour of Rhodes, Matteo Moschetti
 Stages 4 & 7 Tour de Normandie, Matteo Moschetti
 Stage 1 Giro della Valle d'Aosta, Kevin Inkelaar
 Stage 2 Vuelta a Burgos, Matteo Moschetti
 Stage 2 Tour de Hongrie, Matteo Moschetti
2019 
 Stage 3 Giro della Valle d'Aosta, Michel Ries
 Stage 4 Giro della Valle d'Aosta, Juan Pedro López
2020
 Stage 1 Giro Ciclistico d'Italia, Alejandro Ropero
2021
 Stage 14 Giro d'Italia, Lorenzo Fortunato
  Overall Adriatica Ionica Race, Lorenzo Fortunato
Stage 2, Lorenzo Fortunato
  Time Trial Championships, Erik Fetter
 Stage 4 Tour du Limousin, Erik Fetter
2022
 Clàssica Comunitat Valenciana 1969, Giovanni Lonardi
 Time Trial Championships, Erik Fetter
 Stage 4 Tour du Limousin, Vincenzo Albanese

Supplementary statistics

National champions
2021
 Hungary Time Trial, Erik Fetter

Notes

References

External links
 
 

UCI Professional Continental teams
Cycling teams based in Spain
Cycling teams established in 2018
2018 establishments in Spain